Heathwred of Lindisfarne (also cited as Heathored) was Bishop of Lindisfarne from 821 until his death in 830.

Citations

References
 

Bishops of Lindisfarne
830 deaths
9th-century English bishops
Year of birth unknown